In mathematics, a closed manifold is a manifold without boundary that is compact.

In comparison, an open manifold is a manifold without boundary that has only non-compact components.

Examples 

The only connected one-dimensional example is a circle. 
The sphere, torus, and the Klein bottle are all closed two-dimensional manifolds. 
A line is not closed because it is not compact. 
A closed disk is a compact two-dimensional manifold, but it is not closed because it has a boundary.

Open manifolds 

For a connected manifold, "open" is equivalent to "without boundary and non-compact", but for a disconnected manifold, open is stronger. For instance, the disjoint union of a circle and a line is non-compact since a line is non-compact, but this is not an open manifold since the circle (one of its components) is compact.

Abuse of language 

Most books generally define a manifold as a space that is, locally, homeomorphic to Euclidean space (along with some other technical conditions), thus by this definition a manifold does not include its boundary when it is embedded in a larger space.  However, this definition doesn’t cover some basic objects such as a closed disk, so authors sometimes define a manifold with boundary and abusively say manifold without reference to the boundary. But normally, a compact manifold (compact with respect to its underlying topology) can synonymously be used for closed manifold if the usual definition for manifold is used.

The notion of a closed manifold is unrelated to that of a closed set.  A line is a closed subset of the plane, and a manifold,  but not a closed manifold.

Use in physics 

The notion of a "closed universe" can refer to the universe being a closed manifold but more likely refers to the universe being a manifold of constant positive Ricci curvature.

See also

References 

 Michael Spivak: A Comprehensive Introduction to Differential Geometry. Volume 1. 3rd edition with corrections. Publish or Perish, Houston TX 2005, .

Differential geometry
Manifolds
Geometric topology